Agustín Heredia (born 16 June 1997) is an Argentine professional footballer who plays as a centre-back for Cerro Largo on loan from Boca Juniors in the Argentine Primera División.

Club career
Heredia begun playing football at the age of 8 with his local club Quilmes de Villa Allende, where he played as a striker. He moved to the youth academy of Club Deportivo Atalaya and after spending 5 years there, transferred to Boca Juniors in 2015.

Heredia made his professional debut for Boca Juniors in a 3-2 Torneos de Verano loss to Godoy Cruz on 15 January 2018. He debuted in the Copa Libertadores in a 0–0 tie against Alianza Lima on 1 March 2018. Heredia made his Argentine Primera División for Boca Juniors in a 2–0 loss to Argentinos Juniors on 18 March 2018.

International career
Heredia was called up to the Argentina U20s for a training camp in October 2016.

References

External links
 Soccerway Profile
 Boca Juniors Profile

1997 births
Living people
Sportspeople from Córdoba Province, Argentina
Argentine footballers
Argentine expatriate footballers
Boca Juniors footballers
Godoy Cruz Antonio Tomba footballers
Cerro Largo F.C. players
Argentine Primera División players
Uruguayan Primera División players
Association football defenders
Argentine expatriate sportspeople in Uruguay
Expatriate footballers in Uruguay